Kozlowski-Krajewska syndrome, also known as intellectual disability-polydactyly-uncombable hair syndrome is a multi-systemic genetic disorder which is characterized by intellectual disability, abnormalities in the fingers and toes, uncombable hair and facial dysmorphia.

Presentation 

People with K-K syndrome typically show the following symptoms:

 Intellectual disability
 Phalangeal hypoplasia
 Post-axial polydactyly
 Toe syndactyly (affecting the 2nd and 3rd toes), also known as webbed toes
 Uncombable hair syndrome
 Frontal bossing
 Hypotelorism
 Narrow palpebral fissures
 Prominence of nasal root
 Large ears
 Poorly folded helix
 Hypoplasia of the lobule and antitragus
 Progressive micrognathia

Cryptorchidism, hearing loss, and progressive thoracic kyphosis have also been reported.

References 

Genetic diseases and disorders
Rare syndromes